Skinner Peak is a mainly snow-covered peak, over 2,600 m, on the spur that descends northeast from Mount Schopf in Ohio Range, Horlick Mountains. Named by Advisory Committee on Antarctic Names (US-ACAN) for Courtney J. Skinner, geological assistant and camp manager with the Ohio State University expedition to the Horlick Mountains in 1961–62. Skinner visited Antarctica with United States Antarctic Research Program (USARP) every summer season from 1961–62 to 1966–67.

Mountains of Marie Byrd Land